Letchworth Mounds Archaeological State Park is a 188.2 acre Florida State Park that preserves the state's tallest prehistoric, Native American ceremonial earthwork mound, which is  high.  It is estimated to have been built 1100 to 1800 years ago.  This is one of three major surviving mound complexes in the Florida Panhandle.  It is believed to have been built by the Weedon Island Culture (200-800 CE), Native Americans who lived in North Florida.  The hierarchical society planned and constructed massive earthwork mounds as expression of its religious and political system.

The archeological park has exhibits to interpret the artifacts and evidence of nearly 10,000 years of human habitation found at this site.  It is located approximately six miles west of Monticello, a half mile south of U.S. 90, in northwestern Florida. The address is 4500 Sunray Road South.

Two related sites in the panhandle are from the later Fort Walton Culture (1100-1550 CE): Fort Walton Mound, a National Historic Landmark; and the Lake Jackson Mounds Archaeological State Park.

Recreational activities 
The mound has been preserved within a large natural area, which supports such activities as birding, hiking, picnicking and wildlife viewing.

Mound 
Although the mound now has trees and underbrush growing from it, when originally built, such earthwork mounds were typically clear of vegetation, with smooth prepared sides.  Many workers had to bring soils by basket to build the mound.  The builders used their knowledge to combine a variety of soils and shells for stability, and usually finished the top and sides with clay.

The mound likely rose from flat plazas which were intentionally leveled.  They would have served as gathering places for rituals, games and major occasions. The community of which such a tall mound was likely the center would have included nearby dwellings for workers, and communal fields and gardens.  They cultivated maize to support the population density of such complex societies. The Letchworth Mounds site has one of the largest mounds from any site. The mound measures 300 feet in width and has a height between 46 and 50 feet.

This is one of three sites with mounds in the Florida Panhandle. The other two both date from the later Fort Walton Culture (1100-1550 CE).

References

External links 
 Letchworth-Love Mounds Archaeological State Park at Florida State Parks

See also 
 List of Mississippian sites - Mississippian cultures
 List of burial mounds in the United States

Archaeological sites in Florida
State parks of Florida
Parks in Jefferson County, Florida
Florida Native American Heritage Trail
Mounds in Florida